William Robert Nuttall Maloney (12 April 1854 – 29 August 1940) was an Australian doctor and politician. He was a member of parliament for over 50 years, beginning his career in the Victorian Legislative Assembly as the member for the seat of West Melbourne (1889–1903). He was elected to the federal House of Representatives at the 1904 Melbourne by-election, representing the Australian Labor Party (ALP). He held the seat until his death in 1940 at the age of 86, the sixth-longest period of service in federal parliament and the longest period of service as a backbencher.

Early life
Born into a wealthy family in West Melbourne, Maloney was educated in the Melbourne private school system, the University of Melbourne and St Mary's Hospital, London, graduating as a Medical Doctor. Returning to Melbourne in 1888, Maloney divided his time between his obstetrics practice and agitating for social reform. It was during this period that he acquired the nickname that he would retain throughout his life, the Little Doctor.

In 1883, Maloney joined two young Australian artists, Tom Roberts and John Peter Russell, on a walking tour of France and Spain. He visited Russell in Paris on several occasions, and in July 1887, on his final visit, Russell painted his portrait in the Impressionist style and gave it to him to take home to Australia. It remained in his possession until his death in 1940, and in 1943 came into the possession of the National Gallery of Victoria. Maloney also kept in touch with Roberts, and purchased one of the panels from the 9 by 5 Impression Exhibition of 1889.

Colonial politics
Elected to the Victorian colonial Legislative Assembly as the Member for West Melbourne in April 1889, Maloney showed his radical nature by introducing one of the first Bills advocating women's suffrage in the British Empire. He also found the time to establish the Medical Institute, which provided free medical treatment for the poorer denizens of Melbourne.

Federal politics

Maloney resigned from the Assembly in November 1903 to stand for the Division of Melbourne at the 1903 federal election, narrowly losing to the opposing Protectionist Party candidate Malcolm McEacharn. It was actually his second run for the seat; he had stood as the Labor candidate at the first federal election and was soundly defeated by McEacharn. 

However, Maloney protested the much narrower 1903 defeat before the Court of Disputed Elections. He contended that hundreds of applications for ballot papers had been attested by ineligible persons, and that postal ballots had been recorded on material other than ordinary ballot papers. In all, at least 240 "bad votes" had been cast for McEacharn. The Chief Justice ruled that since the votes had been rendered informal through the fault of electoral officers, the only remedy was a new election; had the irregularity been the fault of the voters, he would have declared Maloney the winner. Accordingly, a by-election was run in 1904, which Maloney duly won.

Maloney picked up a large swing in his bid for a full term in 1906, and was comfortably returned in subsequent elections as Melbourne became one of Labor's safest seats. He even stood unopposed in 1929 and 1937. Despite his long service, he was never promoted to Cabinet under the four Labor Prime Ministers who served during his tenure–Chris Watson, Andrew Fisher, Billy Hughes, or James Scullin. Indeed, he was never even considered for ministerial preferment, partly because he was reckoned as a political lightweight. He was a Member of Parliament for 36 years without holding ministerial office, the longest period spent as a backbencher by any member of the House of Representatives.

In September 1907, Maloney accused Liberal MP John Forrest of attempting to lower the age of consent from 14 to 12 during his time as premier of Western Australia. A heated exchange followed in which Forrest called Maloney a "prevaricator", "scoundrel", and a "thing", while Maloney repeatedly called on Forrest to deny his claims. Forrest subsequently told a reporter that Maloney had misrepresented a debate over the age of consent in which it was eventually agree to raise the age from 10 to 16. According to Forrest's biographer, "what was extraordinary about the incident was that Maloney's interjection had nothing whatever to do with the subject then being discussed". The issue was revived in 1909 when another Labor MP William Webster drew attention to the fact that the exchange had not been recorded by Hansard, apparently due to an agreement between Maloney, Forrest, Alfred Deakin, and Speaker Sir Frederick Holder. Maloney revived his accusations against Forrest in 1915.

Maloney retired before the 1940 election, and died just a month before polling day. He was succeeded by his longtime secretary, future Opposition Leader Arthur Calwell.

References

1854 births
1940 deaths
Australian Labor Party members of the Parliament of Australia
Politicians from Melbourne
Medical doctors from Melbourne
Members of the Australian House of Representatives for Melbourne
Melbourne Medical School alumni
Members of the Victorian Legislative Assembly
Australian suffragists
Male feminists
20th-century Australian politicians
People from West Melbourne, Victoria